Dur-Dur Band was a musical group from Mogadishu, Somalia. The band was formed in the 1980s and was one of the most well-known acts on the Mogadishu disco scene at the time. The band later performed and recorded based in neighbouring Ethiopia. Their unique sound encompasses funk and disco, with influences of soul.

History
Inspired by artists such as Michael Jackson, Bob Marley, and Santana, Dur-Dur Band emerged during a time when Somalia's distinctive contribution to the creative culture in the Horn of Africa was visible and abundant. Thousands of recordings made at the Somali National Theatre, Radio Mogadishu and other studios, were complemented by the nightclubs at Hotel Juba, Jazeera Palace Hotel, and Hotel al-Curuuba, creating a flourishing music scene.

By 1987 Dur-Dur Band's line-up featured singers Sahra Abukar Dawo, Abdinur Adan Daljir, Mohamed Ahmed Qomal and Abdukadir Mayow Buunis, backed by Abukar Dahir Qasim (guitar), Abdillahi Ujeeri (Bass Guitar) Yusuf Abdi Haji Aleevi (guitar), Ali Dhere (trumpet), Muse Mohamed Araci (saxophone), Abdul Dhegey (saxophone), Eise Dahir Qasim (keyboard), Mohamed Ali Mohamed (bass), Adan Mohamed Ali Handal (drums), Ooyaaye Eise and Ali Bisha (congas), and Mohamed Karma, Dahir Yaree and Murjaan Ramandan on backing vocals.

Dur Dur Band's name was originally Muqdisho Funk, Disco, Soul Band which later disbanded in the 90s. Dur-Dur Band disbanded in the early 1990s when the disintegrating political situation in Somalia led to members leaving the country and scattering abroad. Dur Dur Band became famous in Somalia in the mid 80s, with lead singers such as Sahra Dawo, AbdiNur Aden Daljir, Pastow, Eddi, Shimali, Qomal and other vocalists. They took Somali pop culture by storm, and were very popular in the neighboring countries of Ethiopia, Djibouti, and Kenya, until civil war broke out in Somalia in 1991. After this, the band was based in Addis Ababa, Ethiopia. The group recorded several albums and managed to release almost a dozen recordings before their members emigrated to Ethiopia, Djibouti, and the United States. The founders of the band, Eise Dahir Qasim and Abdillahi Ujerry,  Sahra Dawo the lead singer of the band who was previously married to Eise Dahir and now to Abdinur Daljir resides in Ohio, United States.  Many Somali musicians fled the country to seek sanctuary outside Somalia, mainly in East Africa and Europe, with many executed or killed by the religious factions for their love of music art and culture.

Somalia is an oral society, and citizens often express their feelings and anxieties through poems, singing, dancing, music, and drama storytelling.  also means 'spring' in Somali.

Dur Dur Band International is a London-based revival band paying homage to the original, co-founded by Abdillahi Ujeeri and Liban Noah in September 2011 led Muhammed Karama, Qomal, Hassan Ujeery, Omar Teesiyow, Ali Atore and Said Hussein. Dur Dur Band International, led by Abdillahi Ujeery with lead singer Fadumina Hilowleh, and including Mustafe TT, Jama Yare, Akila, Said Hussein, Saleh Hariari, Amara, Ali Attore, Mohamed Karama, Omar Teesiyow, Yusuf Naji Mohamed Sheriff, and Mustaf Karama, are still performing around the world.

In March 2013, the record label Awesome Tapes From Africa re-released their 1987 cassette release Volume 5 on LP, CD, and cassette formats. The album received wide critical acclaim from music critics. 

In November 2014, Dur-Dur Band reunited for a single performance at the Cedar Cultural Center in Minneapolis, Minnesota, following a week-long artist residency as part of the "Midnimo" Somali cultural program.

Partial discography
198? - Rafaad iyo Raaxo
198? - Volume 1
198? - Volume 2
1987 - Volume 5
1991 - Africa

References

Somalian musical groups
Musical groups established in the 1980s
1980s establishments in Somalia